The 1991–92 SV Werder Bremen season was their 93rd year of existence. They participated in the Bundesliga, DFB-Pokal and the European Cup Winners' Cup. The finished 9th in the Bundesliga. They lost in a shoot-out to Hannover 96 in the semi-finals of the DFB-Pokal and won European Cup Winners' Cup.

Match results

Legend

Bundesliga

Record vs. opponents

DFB-Pokal

European Cup Winners' Cup

Qualification

First round

Knockout round

Second round

Quarter-finals

Semi-finals

Final

Player information

Transfers

In

Out

Roster & statistics

Bundesliga:
DFB-Pokal:
Cup Winners' Cup:

Coaching staff

References

Match reports

Other sources

SV Werder Bremen seasons
Werder Bremen
UEFA Cup Winners' Cup-winning seasons